St Philip and St James Church is a Church of England church in Hounslow Road, Whitton, Richmond-upon-Thames, London.

Building
The church building was constructed in 1862 when Whitton separated from St Mary's, Twickenham to become a separate parish. The Gostling family, owners of part of the former estate of the Duke of Argyll, donated land at the junction of Hounslow and Kneller Roads for the new Church and for an adjoining vicarage, since replaced; the architect was F H Pownall. The stained glass windows on the east side of the church are by Clayton and Bell (1862); the window on the west side is by Charles Eamer Kempe (1892). On display in the church is a 15th-century alabaster panel of Christ and Arma Christi, imported from Valle Crucis Abbey, Wales, in 1913.

Services

Services are held on weekdays at 9.30 am and on Sunday mornings and evenings. The style of worship is Modern/Contemporary Catholic.

Vicar
The vicar is Rev David Cloake.

References

Further reading
 St Philip & St James: Church of Champions, documentary film by studio Canis Lupus which was produced, directed, filmed and edited by Kezia Newson and Sally Lewis.

External links
 Official website
 Twickenham Museum: Whitton – Then and Now

1862 establishments in England
Whitton
Churches completed in 1862
Diocese of London
Whitton, London